is a Japanese manga artist. He first gained success with his comedy series Seikimatsu Leader den Takeshi! (1997–2002), but is better known for Toriko which was serialized from 2008 to 2016 and has over 25 million copies in circulation. He ranked 14th on Nikkei Entertainment's list of the most successful manga artists between 2010 and 2011.

Career
Shimabukuro was born in Naha, Okinawa, and made his debut as a professional artist in 1996, in Weekly Shōnen Jump. His first serial, Seikimatsu Leader den Takeshi! (1997–2002), earned him the Akatsuka Award for best new manga writer and the 2001 Shogakukan Manga Award for children's manga. 

In 2002, he was arrested and convicted of violating child prostitution laws, including paying a 16-year-old girl ¥80,000 to have sex. As a result of the arrest, Seikimatsu Leader Den Takeshi! was cancelled by Weekly Shōnen Jump. Shimabukuro was sentenced to two years in prison. However, the sentence was suspended for four years.

In 2004, Shimabukuro returned to manga with a sports comedy, Ring, which continued for 3 volumes (24 chapters) in Super Jump magazine. He then temporarily resumed serialization of Seikimatsu Leader den Takeshi! in Super Jump in 2005. Shimabukuro returned to work for Weekly Shōnen Jump in 2008 with Toriko. It became one of the magazine's top sellers, with over 25 million copies in circulation, and was nominated for the 2nd Manga Taishō award in 2009. Toriko was adapted into an anime television series by Toei Animation that aired from 2011–2014 before the manga ended in November 2016. The manga was released in North America by Viz Media and the anime by Funimation.

Shimabukuro is friends with Eiichiro Oda, author of One Piece. In 2011, the two created the Toriko and One Piece crossover one-shot Taste of the Devil Fruit. Shimabukuro stated that he came up with the bulk of the story while Oda gave suggestions.

Shimabukuro published two one-shots in April 2017; Warai no Ōji Penpenpen for Saikyō Jump on April 1 and Chingiri in Weekly Shōnen Jump on April 24. He then contributed two more one-shots to the September 2017 issue of Grand Jump; Jijī 100% and Halftime.

In April 2018, Shimabukuro released a one-shot called Build King in Weekly Shonen Jump. In November 2020, the one-shot became a serial in the same magazine. In December, Shimabukuro revealed that he has switched to digital production of manga. Build King ended in an April 2021 issue, but its third and final tankōbon will feature additional content.

Works

Ring (2004–2005; Super Jump)

Toriko Gaiden (2009)
 – with Eiichiro Oda

Build King (2020–2021, Weekly Shōnen Jump)

References

External links 
 

1975 births
Living people
Manga artists from Okinawa Prefecture
People from Naha